This is a list of arcade video games organized alphabetically by name. It does not include PC or console games unless they were also released in video arcades. See lists of video games for related lists.

This list contains  game titles.

Further reading
Arcade Games, by Jon Blake
Arcade Mania!: The Turbo-charged World of Japan's Game Centers, by Brian Ashcraft
The Encyclopedia of Arcade Video Games, by Bill Kurtz
The First Quarter: A 25 Year History of Video Games, by Steven L. Kent
Gamester's Guide to Arcade Video Games, by Paul Kordestani
Game Over, by David Sheff
Playing the Past: History and Nostalgia in Video Games, edited by Zach Whalen, and Laurie N. Taylor
The Rough Guide To Videogames, by Karen Berens and Geoff Howard
Ultimate Supercade: A Visual History of the Videogame Age 1971–1984, by Van Burnham
The Ultimate History of Video Games, by Steve L. Kent

Magazines
Game Informer
GamePro
GameRoom Magazine

See also
Arcade system board
Golden age of arcade video games
List of gaming topics
List of highest-grossing arcade games
Killer List of Videogames
GameStop

External links

Killer List of Videogames, arcade game information
Arcade-History.com, most authoritative source of arcade game information
Starcade list of the 138 games showcased in their 139 episodes, with fliers pics and video.

Arcade